Miličín is a town in Benešov District in the Central Bohemian Region of the Czech Republic. It has about 800 inhabitants.

Administrative parts
Villages of Kahlovice, Malovice, Nasavrky, Nové Dvory, Petrovice, Reksyně, Záhoří u Miličína and Žibkov are administrative parts of Miličín.

References

Cities and towns in the Czech Republic
Populated places in Benešov District